Stephen I may refer to:

Pope Stephen I, Bishop of Rome from 254 to 257
Stephen I of Antioch, Patriarch of Antioch from 342 to 344
Stephen I of Iberia (died 627), of the Guaramid Dynasty, presiding prince of Iberia from c. 590 to 627
Ecumenical Patriarch Stephen I of Constantinople (867–893), Patriarch of Constantinople
Stephen I, Count of Troyes (died 1020), seventh Count of Meaux
Stephen I of Hungary (967/969/975 – 1038), Grand Prince of the Hungarians and first King of Hungary 
Stephen I of Croatia (ruled 1030–1058)
Stephan I, Count of Sponheim (d. ca. 1080)
Stephen I, Count of Burgundy (1065–1102), Count Palatine of Burgundy, Count of Burgundy and Count of Mâcon and Vienne
Stephen of England (c. 1096 – 1154) may be referred to as Stephen I
Stephen I of Sancerre (1133–1190), Count of Sancerre and son of Count Theobald II of Champagne
Stefan Nemanja (1109–1199), Medieval Serb nobleman, Grand Prince of the medieval Serb state of Rascia
Stephen I, Duke of Bavaria (1271–1310), duke of Lower Bavaria as co-regent of his older brothers Otto III and Louis III 
Stephen I, Ban of Bosnia (1242–1314), Bosnian Ban
Stephen I of Moldavia (r. 1394–1399)
Stephen Báthory of Poland (1533–1586), Hungarian noble Prince of Transylvania, King consort of Poland and Grand Duke consort of Lithuania.

eo:Stefano#Regantoj